Cecilia Gessa (born 22 November 1977), also known as Celia Blanco, is a Spanish actress, producer, director and former pornographic actress.

Career

Early career
Cecilia Gessa was born 22 November 1977 in Madrid, Spain. She comes from a family of artists: her father Fernando Gessa is a writer, her grandmother Fina Gessa was an actress, and her great-grandfather Sebastián Gessa y Arias was a famous painter.

She was trained in Estudio Recabarren, a school of film and television acting operating in Madrid. Upon matriculating, she studied under the renowned Spanish director Yayo Cáceres, leader of the theater company Ron Lalá, and was a member of the theatre company Simpañía. She was mentored in singing and dancing by Óscar Mingorance, Karen Taff and received further acting training with Jo Kelly.

Film career
On cinema, she has taken part in the collective film Sequence, sponsored by Montxo Armendariz (included in the short-film “Vigilantes” of Hermanos Prada).

On television, she appeared in series such as “Impares”, “Bicho Malo” and “RIS Científica” 
In theatre she has taken part, among others, in plays such as “El Comedor” directed by Eduardo Recabarren; “El diario de Ana Frank” directed by Daniel Gacía; “¿Está ocupada esta silla?” and “Todo a su tiempo, cósmico” directed both of them by Max Lemcke; and “¡Ay, que me viene!” directed by Carlos Bardem.
She combines her work as actress with the direction and management of Gessas’ Events Company.  In 2009, she was awarded in Colombia with the Zootropo Prize as the best actress.

In 2010, she began a relationship with the actor Carlos Bardem. 2016 she joined the cast of La_embajada (Antena 3) where she played Lucía Cárdenas, wife of Paco Cárdenas (Carlos Bardem).

References

External links
 

1977 births
Actresses from Madrid
Living people
Spanish film actresses
Spanish stage actresses
Spanish telenovela actresses
21st-century Spanish actresses
Spanish pornographic film actresses